The Moonah Links Golf Club is a golf club in , Victoria, Australia It has hosted the Australian Open twice.

2005 Robert Allenby - 
2003 Peter Lonard -

External links
Moonah Links Golf Club Profile, Golf Australia

Golf clubs and courses in Victoria (Australia)
Buildings and structures in the Shire of Mornington Peninsula
Sport in the Shire of Mornington Peninsula